Scythris pulveratella is a moth of the family Scythrididae. It was described by Bengt Å. Bengtsson in 2014. It is found in South Africa (Western Cape and Northern Cape).

References

Endemic moths of South Africa
pulveratella
Moths described in 2014